Niall O'Brien may refer to:

Niall O'Brien (actor) (1946–2009), Irish actor
Niall O'Brien (cricketer) (born 1981), Irish cricketer
Niall O'Brien (hurler) (born 1994), Irish hurler
Niall O'Brien (priest) (1939–2004), Irish Columban missionary priest

See also
Neil O'Brien (disambiguation)